The Anglican Diocese of Oke-Osun is one of 17 within the Anglican Province of Ibadan, itself one of 14 provinces within the Church of Nigeria. The Bishop Emeritus is Abraham Akinlalu who was succeeded by Foluso Taiwo in 2019. Taiwo died in November 2020, and was succeeded by Oluwagbemiro Fabuluje, elected in January 2021.

Notes

Church of Nigeria dioceses
Dioceses of the Province of Ibadan